The Emigrated Birds (Persian: پرند ه های مهاجر), is a 2013 Persian-language Swedish film produced, written and directed by Shahram Qadir.

Cast
 Mehrdad Khosravani ... Makan
 Saeed Riasatian ... Diako
 Romina Gholami ... Roxana
 Peyman Ebrahimi ... Pezhman
 Sitra Zerang ... Kazhal
Hedyie Shahidi ... Maryam
 Sara Heydari ... Sara
 Nadja ... Farzaneh

Music

Notes and references

External links 
  
 High Beam Research, The Emigrated Birds coming soon, February 2012
  Hewler Magazine, 29 March 2011
  TAW Magazine, July 2008
  Peyk Magazine, January 2013
 Mobarez Online Magazine, 3 February 2013

2013 films
Persian-language films
Swedish drama films
Kurdish films
Kurdish-language films
2010s Swedish films